This is a summary of 2001 in music in the United Kingdom, including the official charts from that year.

The year saw the tradition of UK acts dominating the top of the charts carried on from 2000. Songs were starting to spend 2–3 weeks at the summit improving on the large amounts of one week number ones from the previous year. CD sales also improved slightly with 3 million selling singles being issued this year. Overall, 30 songs topped the charts over the course of this year.

Summary
The first new No. 1 of the year was from the first ever Portuguese act to top the UK charts; Rui Da Silva featuring Cassandra and their dance track, "Touch Me" spent 1-week at the summit. The year ended with the announcement that the pop group Steps were to split up on Boxing Day.

21st century boy bands
Five scored their final chart topper with "Let's Dance", which marked their final single as a group. The follow-up No. 4 hit, "Closer to Me" was released after news of the band's split. They released a Greatest Hits compilation at the end of the year, which made number 9. BBMak were another boyband to split, however their career was very short-lived with 2001 seeing the start and end of it. Their debut single, "Back Here" failed to make the Top 20 upon initial release, however was then re-issued and peaked at #5. The follow-up single, "Still on Your Side" peaked at No. 8 and despite seeming to continue on with success, they disappeared after the release of their debut album Sooner or Later, which was a very slight Top 20 smash.

Blue were the most successful new boy band of 2001; whilst their debut single "All Rise" only made No. 4, other boy bands quickly fading away meant that it wasn't long before Blue could take centre stage. Their next two singles, "Too Close" (a cover of the 1998 U.S. chart topper from American boy band Next) and "If You Come Back", a slow love ballad, quickly became chart toppers for the group. However, once again, Westlife became the most successful boy band of the year. Although their run of consecutive No. 1 singles had been broken the previous year by Bob the Builder, they quickly returned to the top spot with the Comic Relief single of the year, "Uptown Girl" (a cover of the Billy Joel 1983 UK number 1) and "Queen of My Heart". By the end of the year, they had accumulated a total of 9 No. 1 singles on the UK chart, putting them side by side with the Spice Girls and ABBA. Their 3rd album, entitled World of Our Own, topped the UK albums chart for 1-week.

ABC aired a talent show, Making the Band, in which by the public vote, boyband O-Town were picked as winners. Their debut single, "Liquid Dreams" peaked at No. 3 in the UK and their follow-up, "All Or Nothing", stalled one place lower.

The Backstreet Boys released The Hits: Chapter One, which went platinum. The greatest hits album featured a new song, "Drowning", which got to number 4.

Girl groups
Girl groups were slowly changing away from 90s pop styles to a more R'N'B/Hip Hop direction. All Saints scored their final UK chart hit, with "All Hooked Up", a final release from their second album, peaking at #7. A greatest hits compilation, entitled All Hits followed, but it only made No. 18 on the albums chart.

Replacing Kerry Katona, Jenny Frost joined girl group Atomic Kitten, who became one of the main early 21st century pop girl groups. After the member change, the band's single "Whole Again", hit No. 1 for 4 weeks, becoming the longest stay since Westlife at New Year in 1999/2000 and also the 4th biggest selling single of the year. They scored a 2nd chart topper later in the year with a remake of The Bangles' "Eternal Flame" chart topper from 1989, which spent 2 weeks at the top and continued on to be one of the most successful groups of the decade.

Destiny's Child started the new trend for girl groups to veer away from pop, as their chart-topping third album, Survivor, spanned a 2nd consecutive No. 1 hit with the title track. The third single, "Emotion" peaked at #3. Mis-teeq, a girl group in a similar vein to Destiny's Child, scored great success throughout the year, with their No. 3 album Lickin' On Both Sides spanning 3 Top 10 hits; "Why", their No. 8 debut, "All I Want" (#2) & One Night Stand (#5). 3LW also made their debut on the UK charts with the No. 6 hit "No More (Baby I'ma Do Right)". Their follow-up single only made No. 21 and their eponymous debut album was not released in the UK.

Film and TV music
2001 was a moderately successful year for film and television music, providing some memorable hit singles and albums. The Tweenies and Bob The Builder both released singles, the former of which was a Christmas release making No. 9 and the latter having his 2nd No. 1 single with a re-make of the No. 1 from 1999 by Lou Bega, "Mambo No. 5". This 2nd No. 1 made Bob the first non-human who "sung" on his recordings to hit the top more than once.

Two very successful movies, Moulin Rouge! and Bridget Jones's Diary, had equally successful soundtracks and produced memorable hit singles each. On the Bridget Jones soundtrack, former Spice Girl Geri Halliwell had a chart-topping hit with a cover of The Weather Girls classic "It's Raining Men", while Gabrielle provided her vocals on the No. 4 hit "Out of Reach" which became her first Top 5 single since the chart-topping "Rise" in early 2000. The Moulin Rouge!collaboration proved to be slightly more successful with Christina Aguilera joining forces with Pink, Lil' Kim and Mýa on a cover of the 1975 hit single "Lady Marmalade" (itself previously covered in 1998 by All Saints. Their version proved to be even more successful, topping the charts worldwide and becoming the 900th single to top the UK charts.

Glitter became Mariah Carey's acting debut and the soundtrack became her 10th album release. Despite her massive worldwide success throughout the 90s, the new millennium did not take so kindly to her as both the movie and the soundtrack were a critical and commercial flop. Lead single "Loverboy" failed to make much of an impact, peaking at No. 12 in the UK (made No. 2 in the US, breaking her run of lead single chart toppers). The album peaked at No. 10 in the UK, another weak showing on Carey's behalf. Enough although the former of these singles failed to chart in the US and the latter was not released due to the weak performance of prior singles, "Never Too Far/Last Night a DJ Saved My Life" was able to crack the UK Top 40, peaking at #32.

2001 also saw the beginning of music talent programmes with the band Hear'Say being created on the T.V programme "Popstars" in the UK. It would go on to spawn the creation of similar formats including the British "Pop Idol", American version, "American Idol" and "The X Factor".

Charts

Number-one singles

Number-one albums

Number-one compilation albums

Year-end charts

Best-selling singles
Data based on sales from 31 December 2000 to 29 December 2001.

Best-selling albums
Data based on sales from 31 December 2000 to 29 December 2001.

Notes:

Best-selling compilation albums
Data based on sales from 31 December 2000 to 29 December 2001.

See also
2001 in British radio
2001 in British television
2001 in the United Kingdom
List of British films of 2001
List of UK Dance Singles Chart number ones of 2001
List of UK Independent Singles Chart number ones of 2001
List of UK Rock & Metal Singles Chart number ones of 2001

References

 UK Charts Plus: Top 200 Singles and Albums of 2001

External links
The Official Charts Company

 
United Kingdom
British record charts